Billett is an unincorporated community in Lawrence County, Illinois, United States.

The elevation of Billett is 423 feet and falls under the Central Time Zone (UTC -6 hours).

References

Unincorporated communities in Lawrence County, Illinois
Unincorporated communities in Illinois